Leah Sottile is an American journalist, writer, and podcast host who lives in Portland, Oregon.

Education 
Sottile graduated from Gonzaga University in 2003.

Career 
Sottile is the author of the book "When the Moon Turns to Blood," about the disappearances of JJ Vallow and Tylee Ryan, and the cases of Lori Vallow and Chad Daybell. 

Sottile covered the Malheur occupation court trials for The Washington Post and Outside Magazine, and regularly talked about the trials as a guest on Oregon Public Broadcasting programming. She is the host of the podcasts Bundyville and Bundyville: The Remnant, produced through Longreads, and Two Minutes Past Nine produced by BBC Radio 4. She has written for Rolling Stone, Outside, High Country News and The Washington Post on subjects related to the American West.

Sottile was also the music editor of Spokane, Washington's alt-weekly newspaper, The Inlander. She characterizes bands in Spokane as "willing to take a lot more risks," and also says that: "It's super easy to disregard Spokane. It's seen as a cultural void. But there is a really mobilized youth art movement here that's always anchored in the music scene. I've seen shows in boxing rings, art centers, [and] all kinds of alternative spaces. People in Spokane are scrappy about making it work. That's the backbone of the scene: making a party where there wasn't one before."

Sottile won first place in a Society of Professional Journalists 2015 competition for the Willamette Week article "The Newest Portlanders". Sottile has been a professor of journalism at the University of Montana.

While on staff with The Inlander, Sottile won the Washington State 2011–2012 Mental Health Reporting Award for "The People Left Behind," which features "an in-depth
exploration of a 13-year-old's death by suicide and the broader issues of mental health and suicide-prevention in Spokane and the Inland Empire". She also won third place in a Society of Professional Journalists 2010 competition for "Blood Sport," an article on backyard wrestling in Spokane.

Sottile was also a guest on KUOW-FM programming, where she talked about an article she wrote for Outside about a Bigfoot sighting by Bob Gimlin.

References

Living people
American women journalists
Journalists from Portland, Oregon
Place of birth missing (living people)
Year of birth missing (living people)
21st-century American women
Gonzaga University alumni